Wamanpinta (Quechua for Chuquiraga, also spelled Huamanpinta) is a mountain in the Cordillera Blanca in the Andes of Peru which reaches a height of approximately . It is located in the Ancash Region, Huaraz Province, Pira District.

Sources

Mountains of Peru
Mountains of Ancash Region